The 2009 Final Four Women’s Volleyball Cup Chinalco Cup was the second edition of the annual women's volleyball tournament, played by four countries from September 9–13, 2009 in Lima, Peru. The teams qualified through the 2009 Pan-American Cup, held in Miami, Florida.

Competing Nations

Squads

Preliminary round

Wednesday September 9, 2009

Thursday September 10, 2009

Friday September 11, 2009

Final round

Semifinals
Saturday September 12, 2009

Finals
Sunday September 13, 2009

Final ranking

Individual awards

Most Valuable Player

Best Scorer

Best Spiker

Best Blocker

Best Server

Best Digger

Best Setter

Best Receiver

Best Libero

References

External links
 NORCECA Results
 USA Volleyball

Final Four Women's Volleyball Cup
Wor
International volleyball competitions hosted by the United States
2009 in American women's sports
Volleyball in Peru
Voll
Volleyball in Florida